Kalyani Sen (born ), was Second Officer of the Women’s Royal Indian Naval Service (WRINS), a section of the Women's Auxiliary Corps (India) WAC(I). In 1945, she became the first Indian service woman to visit the UK.

Sen was the daughter of the principal of the Mayo Arts College, Lahore. In 1938 she gained a masters in English literature from the Punjab University before commencing studies for a masters in political science. As a student she performed in theatre and at one time played Ophelia in the play Hamlet, at a time when Indian women did not typically act on stage. Her success on stage led to her being sought out for cinema. In 1938, while a student at Punjab University, at a session of the All-India Inter-University Debate, she was announced as the best speaker after she spoke against the proposal that India should not contribute to future wars. That debate won her the gold medal and Punjab University the Sir Ashutosh Mukherjee trophy.

In 1943, during the Second World War, Sen joined the WAC(I). The following year she received the King's commission as Second Officer.

Early life and education
Kalyani Sen (née Gupta), affectionately known as 'Babli', was born around 1917, the only daughter of S. N. Gupta, an artist and the principal of the Mayo Arts College, Lahore, and Mrs. Gupta, who later became a chief commander for the Women's Auxiliary Corps (India) WAC(I). Her grandfather was the journalist Nagendranath Gupta. She studied at Kinnaird College and Government College, both in Lahore. At the 13th annual exhibition of the Punjab Fine Arts Society in 1935, she was listed one of the prize winners. At Government College, she performed in open air theatre, and played Ophelia in the play Hamlet, at a time when Indian women did not typically act on stage. Her success on stage led to her being sought out for cinema in then Calcutta.

In 1938, she gained a masters in English literature from the Punjab University before commencing studies for a masters in political science. There, she took part in debates including arguing against the notion that "sport is not in the domain of women." In the same year at a session of the All-India Inter-University Debate, organised by the Calcutta University Law College union, she was announced as the best speaker after she spoke against the proposal "That India should be no party to future wars." That debate won her the gold medal and Punjab University the Sir Ashutosh Mukherjee trophy.

Second World War
In 1943, during the Second World War, Sen joined the WAC(I). The following year she received the King's commission as Second Officer. In 1945, now an officer for the Women’s Royal Indian Naval Service (WRINS), she became the first Indian service woman to visit the UK, at the age of 28. Along with Chief Officer Margaret I. Cooper and second officer Phyllis Cunningham, their purpose was to carry out a two month study of training and administration in the Women's Royal Naval Service (WRNS), by visiting WRNS establishments across Britain. They arrived in the UK on 13 April of that year and attended a press conference that same day. Sen made broadcasts from the BBC in English and Bengali, and attended a ceremony at Buckingham Palace. She reported that "In India there is still a big prejudice against girls and women working with men… but the women are so keen to get into the Services that they are breaking it down." On 3 July 1945, they left the UK to return to India. At the time, her husband was serving with the Indian Army in Burma.

Personal life
During her course in political science in 1939, she married Captain (later Lieutenant-General) Lionel Protip Sen of the Baluch Regiment. Her first daughter, Radha, was born in 1941. In 1947, she gave birth to Mala. In 1953, her marriage to L. P. Sen ended in divorce.

Footnotes

References

External links 
 . The Better India

Kinnaird College for Women University alumni
Government College University, Lahore alumni
1910s births
University of the Punjab alumni
Indian women in war
Indian women of World War II
Date of death missing